Melhania ovata is a plant in the family Malvaceae.

Description
The flowers have yellow petals.

Distribution and habitat
Melhania ovata is native to tropical Africa, the Arabian Peninsula and Pakistan. In Pakistan, it was known from Balochistan but rare and considered possibly introduced.

References

ovata
Flora of Africa
Flora of the Arabian Peninsula
Flora of Pakistan
Plants described in 1799
Taxa named by Antonio José Cavanilles